The Todor Vlaykov National Literary Prize is a Bulgarian literary award that was established by a decision of the Pirdop Municipal Council in 2007.

It is named after famed Bulgarian literary figure Todor Vlaykov.

The award is presented every two years (according to the statute) during 'Vlaykov Day' in Pirdop, usually held around May 24. It consists of a statuette depicting the full-length figure of Todor Vlaykov (the designer of the sculpture is Ivan Lyubenov), as well as a cash prize of BGN 1,000.

Recipients 
2007 - Kancho Kozhuharov for the short story "The Relic"
2008 - Mihail Nedelchev for overall contribution to the study of the work and social and political activities of Todor Vlaykov, for the continuation of the traditions of radical democracy in Bulgaria, as well as for the restoration of the magazine "Democratic Review".
2010 - Georgi Danailov - for overall creativity
2012 - Alexander Hristov for the story "Africa", Olya Stoyanova for the story "Two loaves and a box of cigarettes", Ivan Dimitrov for the novel Promise of Summer and Dimitrinka Nenova for the work "When the heart speaks".
2015 - Ivan Granitski for overall contribution
2017 - Simeon Yanev for overall contribution
2019 - Neda Antonova - for overall creativity

References 

Bulgarian literary awards
Awards established in 2007